Gümeli is a forest belde (town) in Alaplı district of  Zonguldak Province, Turkey. The population of Gümeli is 1984 as of 2011. Gümeli is a relatively a new settlement. In 1988 a part of Gümeli was administratively issued from Gümeli to found Erenköy. In 1992, Gümeli was declared a seat of township.

References

Populated places in Zonguldak Province
Towns in Turkey
Alaplı